Mercury Men can refer to:

The Mercurymen, a British acoustical band
The Mercurymen (Canadian band), a Canadian band of the same name
The Mercury Men, a web series produced by the Syfy network